Luís Vázquez Fernández-Pimentel (b. Lugo, 18 December 1895 – d. Lugo, 13 February 1958) was a Galician poet.

Galician Literature Day is dedicated to him in 1990.

Work
 Triscos (1950). Colección Benito Soto .
 Sombra do aire na herba (1959). Galaxia .
 Barco sin luces (1960) .
 Poesía enteira (1981). Edicións Xerais de Galicia.
 Luis Pimentel. Obra inédita o no recopilada (1981). Celta.
 Poesía galega (1989). Edicións Xerais de Galicia.
 Poesías completas, de Luís Pimentel (1990). Comares.
 Luís Pimentel. Obra completa (2009). Galaxia.

References

Bibliography 

 Agustín Fernández, S. (2007). "Luis Pimentel, poeta del abismo interior"". Madrygal (10): 35–43. ISSN 1138-9664.
 Alonso Montero, X. (1990). Luís Pimentel, biografía da súa poesía. Do Cumio. .
 Blanco, C. (2005). Extranjera en su patria. Cuatro poetas gallegos. Rosalía de Castro, Manuel Antonio, Luís Pimentel, Luz Pozo Garza. Círculo de Lectores / Galaxia Gutenberg. .
 Carballo Calero, R. (1978). "Originales inéditos en castellano de poemas de Luis Pimentel publicados en gallego". 1916. Anuario de la Sociedad Española de Literatura General y Comparada (1): 68–83.
 —————— (1980). "Sobre la poesía de Luis Pimentel". 1916. Anuario de la Sociedad Española de Literatura General y Comparada (3): 41–50.
 Fernández de la Vega, C. (1983). "Vida e poesía de Luís Pimentel". Sombra do aire na herba. BBdCG. Galaxia.
 Fernández del Riego, F. (1971) [1951]. Historia da literatura galega (2ª ed.). Galaxia. pp. 221–223.
 —————— (1990). Diccionario de escritores en lingua galega. Do Castro. p. 450. .
 Fernández Rodríguez, Manuel, ed. (2006). Poemas pola memoria. 1936-2006. Xunta de Galicia.
 García, J., ed. (2001). Poetas del Novecientos: entre el Modernismo y la Vanguardia: (Antología). Tomo I: De Fernando Fortún a Rafael Porlán. BSCH. pp. 182–201. .
 Gómez, A.; Queixas, M. (2001). Historia xeral da literatura galega. A Nosa Terra. p. 205-206. .
 Herrero Figueroa, A. (1991). "Luis Pimentel, poeta hispánico". Turia (16): 123–146. ISSN 0213-4373.
 —————— (1994). Sobre Luís Pimentel, Álvaro Cunqueiro e Carballo Calero: apontamentos de Filoloxía, Crítica e Didáctica da Literatura. Do Castro. .
 —————— (2007). Unha cidade e un poeta (Lugo e Luís Pimentel). Deputación. .
 López-Casanova, A. (1990). Luís Pimentel e Sombra do aire na herba. Ágora. Galaxia. .
 Méndez Ferrín, X. L. (1984). De Pondal a Novoneyra. Xerais. pp. 52, 306. .
 Pallarés, P. (1991). Rosas na sombra (a poesía de Luís Pimentel). Do Cumio. .
 Piñeiro, R. (1958). "Luis Pimentel". Boletín da RAG (327-332): 180-183. ISSN 1576-8767.
 Piñeiro, Pozo, López-Casanova, Rodriguez and Murado (1990). Luís Pimentel, unha fotobiografía. Xerais. .
 Sánchez Reboredo, J. (1989). El silencio y la música (Ensayo sobre la poesía de Pimentel) (en español). .
 Vilavedra, D., ed. (1995). "Vázquez Fernández, Luís". Diccionario da Literatura Galega. I. Autores. Galaxia. pp. 597–599. .

External links 

 
  
 
 "Pimentel, Luis Vázquez Fernández (1895-1958)" Enciclopedia Universal Micronet .

People from Lugo
Galician poets
1895 births
1958 deaths
Galician-language writers
20th-century Spanish poets
Spanish male poets
University of Santiago de Compostela alumni
20th-century Spanish male writers